is a  international racing circuit located near Kamitsue village in Ōita Prefecture, Japan on the  northeast of Kumamoto. Opened in 1990, it hosts a range of domestic and international motorsport events throughout the year. The track is noted to have a high standard of facilities and infrastructure. Due to the circuit ending up in financial difficulties, it has changed hands several times but still operates to this day.

History 
The circuit, located within Aso Kujū National Park, was built at a cost of $500 million by the wealthy real-estate developer and investment banker Tomonori Tsurumaki who made headlines in 1989, when during a Paris auction, he successfully bid a Pablo Picasso painting Les Noces de Pierrette for $51.3 million from his Tokyo hotel room. Following his successful bid, he announced that his painting was to hang at the art gallery of the auto racing resort, under development at the time.

The circuit was designed by Yoshitoshi Sakurai who was the project leader of the Honda F1 team during the 1960s.

Tsurumaki ordered 30 Buick powered US built single seater race cars called "Sabre Cars" for a race to take place on his circuit's grand opening, on November 1990 consisting of a mixture of invited US CART drivers such as Stan Fox, Johnny Rutherford, Dick Simon, Gary and Tony Bettenhausen, against local Japanese drivers. After the grand opening, Tsurumaki planned on a series with the cars, known as Formula Crane 45. A few races were run in 1991, with only a handful of cars competing.

The only major international race held at Autopolis was the final race of the 1991 World Sportscar Championship season, the 1991 430km of Autopolis, which was won by Michael Schumacher and Karl Wendlinger in a Mercedes-Benz C291 fielded by Sauber.

To promote the venue's intention to host a Formula One race, it sponsored the Benetton Formula One team in 1990 and 1991. The cars featured prominent Autopolis logos. Visitors to the WSC event criticized the track for being too remote to the hotels which required a several hours bus ride and felt that it was unsuitable for an F1 race. 

Following the bankruptcy and collapse of Tsurumaki's company Nippon Tri-Trust in 1993 (the year the track was supposed to hold an F1 race), the circuit and other assets he owned ended up in the hands of Hazama who was responsible for the construction of the race track. Ultimately, the track's F1 event slot for the Asian GP on 11 April 1993 was given to Donington Park, and TI Circuit Aida would host a second Japanese race in Formula One calendar in 1994, but suffered from the same location-related criticism and was removed at the end of the following season.

By 1995, the company offered the site for sale at 10% of its build cost which consisted of three hotels, swimming pools and an artificial ski slope. Some of Tsurumaki's assets, such as paintings, remained in a bank vault waiting to be sold.

Autopolis first hosted a Super GT race in 1999, the season-ending exhibition race, which was won by Tom Coronel and Hidetoshi Mitsusada in a Honda NSX-GT fielded by Nakajima Racing. After a three-year absence, the circuit has regularly been hosting races in the series since 2003, although with some exceptions. Autopolis first held a Super Formula race in 2006, and with some exceptions, the track has regularly been part of the series since then.

Autopolis was purchased by Kawasaki in 2005.

The circuit currently holds events for the Super GT as well as D1 Grand Prix, Super Formula, MFJ Superbike and Super Taikyu.

In March 2019, the circuit was added to the video game Gran Turismo Sport through a game update. It has also been featured in Need for Speed: ProStreet, Need for Speed: Shift and Shift 2: Unleashed.

The circuit
The circuit is located in an upland area of the island which means the air is thin with low atmospheric pressure, similar to Autódromo Hermanos Rodríguez in Mexico City.

Lap records 

The fastest official race lap records at the Autopolis are listed as:

Events

 Current

 May: Super Formula Championship, Super Formula Lights, Ferrari Challenge Japan
 July: Super Taikyu
 September: MFJ Superbikes
 October: Super GT, F4 Japanese Championship

 Former

 Asia Road Racing Championship (2009–2014)
 Asian Touring Car Series (2003–2005, 2007)
 Formula BMW Asia (2004–2005)
 Formula Regional Japanese Championship (2020)
 Formula V6 Asia (2007)
 Japanese Touring Car Championship (1991–1994)
 TCR Japan Touring Car Series (2019–2021)
 World Sportscar Championship 430 km of Autopolis (1991)

References

External links

Official website in Japanese
Circuit map and full history at RacingCircuits.info
Article about the origins of the Autopolis circuit
Circuits' Map
Satellite picture by Google Maps

Motorsport venues in Japan
Sports venues in Ōita Prefecture
Sports venues completed in 1990
1990 establishments in Japan